Cicadulina is a leafhopper genus in the tribe Macrostelini.

Cicadulina species are vectors of the maize streak virus, a disease which is a sporadic but severe in sub-Saharan Africa. The cause is a geminivirus which is persistently transmitted by Cicadulina leafhoppers. The disease is also transmitted to Urochloa panicoides, a fodder grass originating in Southern Africa.

The maize orange leafhopper Cicadulina bipunctata has been reported to induce gall-like structures on maize in Japan.

References

External links 

Cicadellidae genera
Insect vectors of plant pathogens
Macrostelini